Yates Spur is a prominent rock spur on the south side of Mobiloil Inlet, Bowman Coast, at the west side of the terminus of Earnshaw Glacier. The spur was photographed from the air by Lincoln Ellsworth, 1935, United States Antarctic Service (USAS), 1940, and Ronne Antarctic Research Expedition (RARE), 1947, and was surveyed by Falkland Islands Dependencies Survey (FIDS), 1958. Named by Advisory Committee on Antarctic Names (US-ACAN) in 1977 after D. Kent Yates, Applied Research Laboratories, University of Texas, a member of the United States Geological Survey (USGS) satellite surveying team at Palmer Station, winter party 1973 and a research scientist and programmer with the University of Illinois from 1982 to 2008.

Mountains of Graham Land
Bowman Coast